The Little River is a short river in Madawaska, Maine, about  from the Canada–United States border. 
The river flows west  from its source to Long Lake. The lake drains — via Mud Lake, Cross Lake, Square Lake, and Eagle Lake — into the Fish River, a tributary of the Saint John River.

See also
List of rivers of Maine

References

Maine Streamflow Data from the USGS
Maine Watershed Data From Environmental Protection Agency

Tributaries of the Saint John River (Bay of Fundy)
Rivers of Aroostook County, Maine